Alexandra Bíróová (born 13 July 1991) is a Slovak football midfielder who currently plays for SKN St. Pölten of the Austrian Frauenliga. She has played in the UEFA Women's Champions League with her previous clubs Slovan Duslo Šaľa and SV Neulengbach.

She is a member of the Slovak national team. On 10 April 2021, Bíróová played her 100th match for Slovakia in a 0–0 draw with Mexico.

International goals

Titles
 ÖFB-Frauenliga (8): 2009–10 — 2013–14, 2015–16 — 2017–18
 ÖFB Ladies Cup (6): 2009–10 — 2011–12, 2015–16 — 2017–18

References

External links

 Profile at SKN St. Pölten 
 Profile at futbalsfz.sk.

1991 births
Living people
Women's association football defenders
Women's association football midfielders
Slovak women's footballers
Sportspeople from Dunajská Streda
Slovakia women's international footballers
SV Neulengbach (women) players
FSK St. Pölten-Spratzern players
FK Slovan Duslo Šaľa (women) players
FC DAC 1904 Dunajská Streda players
Slovak expatriate footballers
Slovak expatriate sportspeople in Austria
Expatriate women's footballers in Austria
ÖFB-Frauenliga players
FIFA Century Club